Woodbury Heights is a borough in Gloucester County, in the U.S. state of New Jersey. As of the 2020 United States census, the borough's population was 3,098, an increase of 43 (+1.4%) from the 2010 census count of 3,055, which in turn reflected an increase of 67 (+2.2%) from the 2,988 counted in the 2000 census.

Woodbury Heights was formed as a borough by an act of the New Jersey Legislature on April 6, 1915, from portions of Deptford Township, based on the results of a referendum held on April 27, 1915. Portions were exchanged with Woodbury in 1925, and portions of the city were annexed on March 22, 1938. Portions were exchanged with Deptford Township in 1956 and other portions were annexed from the township in 1965. The borough was named for the city of Woodbury, which in turn was named for its founder Henry Wood, who settled in the area in 1683 after arriving from Bury, England, at the age of 80 to escape religious persecution.

As of 2020, the borough had the 19th-highest property tax rate in New Jersey with an equalized rate of 4.442% compared to 3.212% in the county as a whole and a statewide average of 2.279%.

Geography
According to the U.S. Census Bureau, the borough had a total area of 1.25 square miles (3.24 km2), including 1.25 square miles (3.23 km2) of land and 0.01 square miles (0.02 km2) of water (0.48%). Glen Lake, although no longer open for swimming, is available for fishing and non-motorized boating.

The borough borders the Gloucester County municipalities of Deptford Township, West Deptford Township, and Woodbury.

Demographics

2010 census

The Census Bureau's 2006–2010 American Community Survey showed that (in 2010 inflation-adjusted dollars) median household income was $82,411 (with a margin of error of +/− $6,735) and the median family income was $91,667 (+/− $14,100). Males had a median income of $68,478 (+/− $6,757) versus $49,327 (+/− $4,589) for females. The per capita income for the borough was $33,099 (+/− $2,495). About 0.7% of families and 1.0% of the population were below the poverty line, including 1.0% of those under age 18 and none of those age 65 or over.

2000 census
As of the 2020 U.S. census, there were 2,988 people, 1,027 households, and 825 families residing in the borough. The racial makeup of the borough was 96.35% White, 1.54% African American or Black, 0.27% Native American, 1.00% Asian, 0.00% Pacific Islander, 0.47% from other races, and 0.37% from two or more races.  1.24% of the population were Hispanic or Latino of any race.

There were 1,027 households, out of which 38.2% had children under the age of 18 living with them, 66.4% were married couples living together, 9.6% had a female householder with no husband present, and 19.6% were non-families. 16.7% of all households were made up of individuals, and 8.1% had someone living alone who was 65 years of age or older. The average household size was 2.89 and the average family size was 3.24.

In the borough, the population was spread out, with 26.1% under the age of 18, 6.7% from 18 to 24, 29.2% from 25 to 44, 24.7% from 45 to 64, and 13.3% who were 65 years of age or older. The median age was 38 years. For every 100 females, there were 92.6 males.  For every 100 females age 18 and over, there were 90.8 males.

The median income for a household in the borough was $63,266, and the median income for a family was $70,167. Males had a median income of $51,342 versus $33,220 for females. The per capita income for the borough was $24,001. 4.1% of the population and 2.4% of families were below the poverty line.  Out of the total people living in poverty, 3.7% were under the age of 18 and 2.8% were 65 or older.

Government

Local government
Woodbury Heights is governed under the Borough form of New Jersey municipal government, which is used in 218 (of the 564) municipalities statewide, making it the most common form of government in New Jersey. The governing body is comprised of the Mayor and the Borough Council, with all positions elected at-large on a partisan basis as part of the November general election. A Mayor is elected directly by the voters to a four-year term of office. The Borough Council is comprised of six members elected to serve three-year terms on a staggered basis, with two seats coming up for election each year in a three-year cycle. The Borough form of government used by Woodbury Heights is a "weak mayor / strong council" government in which council members act as the legislative body with the mayor presiding at meetings and voting only in the event of a tie. The mayor can veto ordinances subject to an override by a two-thirds majority vote of the council. The mayor makes committee and liaison assignments for council members, and most appointments are made by the mayor with the advice and consent of the council.

At the January 2019 reorganization meeting, the borough council appointed Robert J. Morrison to fill the seat expiring in December 2019 that became vacant when William C. Packer took office as mayor and appointed Jeffrey A. Pitzo to fill the seat expiring in December 2020 that had been held by Eshia "Jake" Jacob.

, the Mayor of Woodbury Heights is Democrat William C. Packer, whose term of office ends December 31, 2022. Borough Council members are Richard J. Gambale (D, 2023), Joseph M. Getsinger (D, 2024), Robert J. Morrison Jr. (D, 2022), Jeffrey A. Pitzo (D, 2023; elected to serve an unexpired term), Harold A. "Hap" Pye Jr. (D, 2024) and Cara M. Witasick (D, 2022).

Federal, state, and county representation
Woodbury Heights is located in the 1st Congressional District and is part of New Jersey's 3rd state legislative district. Prior to the 2011 reapportionment following the 2010 Census, Woodbury Heights had been in the 5th state legislative district.

Politics
As of March 2011, there were a total of 2,255 registered voters in Woodbury Heights, of which 843 (37.4%) were registered as Democrats, 397 (17.6%) were registered as Republicans and 1,011 (44.8%) were registered as Unaffiliated. There were 4 voters registered as Libertarians or Greens.

In the 2012 presidential election, Democrat Barack Obama received 56.9% of the vote (946 cast), ahead of Republican Mitt Romney with 42.2% (702 votes), and other candidates with 0.9% (15 votes), among the 1,673 ballots cast by the borough's 2,275 registered voters (10 ballots were spoiled), for a turnout of 73.5%. In the 2008 presidential election, Democrat Barack Obama received 54.7% of the vote (990 cast), ahead of Republican John McCain with 42.4% (768 votes) and other candidates with 1.8% (33 votes), among the 1,811 ballots cast by the borough's 2,304 registered voters, for a turnout of 78.6%. In the 2004 presidential election, Democrat John Kerry received 51.5% of the vote (906 ballots cast), outpolling Republican George W. Bush with 47.2% (830 votes) and other candidates with 0.8% (17 votes), among the 1,760 ballots cast by the borough's 2,239 registered voters, for a turnout percentage of 78.6.

In the 2013 gubernatorial election, Republican Chris Christie received 61.7% of the vote (625 cast), ahead of Democrat Barbara Buono with 36.6% (371 votes), and other candidates with 1.7% (17 votes), among the 1,040 ballots cast by the borough's 2,249 registered voters (27 ballots were spoiled), for a turnout of 46.2%. In the 2009 gubernatorial election, Democrat Jon Corzine received 44.6% of the vote (532 ballots cast), ahead of Republican Chris Christie with 41.4% (494 votes), Independent Chris Daggett with 11.4% (136 votes) and other candidates with 0.8% (9 votes), among the 1,193 ballots cast by the borough's 2,274 registered voters, yielding a 52.5% turnout.

Education
The Woodbury Heights School District serves public school students in kindergarten through sixth grade at Woodbury Heights Elementary School. As of the 2019–20 school year, the district, comprised of one school, had an enrollment of 253 students and 23.9 classroom teachers (on an FTE basis), for a student–teacher ratio of 10.6:1.

For seventh through twelfth grade, public school students attend Gateway Regional High School, a regional public high school established in 1964 that serves students from the boroughs of National Park, Wenonah, Westville and Woodbury Heights, as part of the Gateway Regional High School District. As of the 2019–20 school year, the high school had an enrollment of 900 students and 79.0 classroom teachers (on an FTE basis), for a student–teacher ratio of 11.4:1.

Students from across the county are eligible to apply to attend Gloucester County Institute of Technology, a four-year high school in Deptford Township that provides technical and vocational education. As a public school, students do not pay tuition to attend the school.

St. Margaret Regional School is a PreK–8 elementary school founded in 1963 that operates under the auspices of the Roman Catholic Diocese of Camden.

Transportation

Roads and highways

County Road 553 passes through the heart of the borough, while Route 45 runs along the borough's western border. The New Jersey Turnpike passes through, but the closest interchange is 15–20 minutes away at Exit 3 in Camden County.

Interstate 295 and Route 55 are accessible in neighboring communities.

Public transportation
NJ Transit bus service is available on the 410 route between Glassboro and Philadelphia and on the 412 route between Sewell and Philadelphia.

The borough is the site of a planned stop on the Glassboro–Camden Line, an  diesel multiple unit light rail system.

Notable people

People who were born in, residents of, or otherwise closely associated with Woodbury Heights include:
 Daniel Webster Cluff (1916–1989), United States Coast Guard officer who led the February 1952 effort that resulted in the rescue of 32 survivors from the SS Pendleton
 Grace Helbig (born 1985), comedian, actress and YouTube personality
 Helen Sommers (1932–2017), politician who served in the Washington House of Representatives from 1972 to 2009
 Stephen Starr (born 1957), CEO of Starr Restaurants

References

External links

 Borough of Woodbury Heights
 Woodbury Heights Elementary School
 
 School Data for the Woodbury Heights Elementary School, National Center for Education Statistics

 
1915 establishments in New Jersey
Borough form of New Jersey government
Boroughs in Gloucester County, New Jersey
Populated places established in 1915